Inca Roca (Quechua Inka Roq'a, "magnanimous Inca") was the sixth Sapa Inca of the Kingdom of Cusco (beginning around CE 1350) and the first of the Hanan ("upper") Qusqu dynasty. His wife was Mama Michay, and his son was Yawar Waqaq.

He had four other famous sons, Inca Paucar, Huaman Taysi Inca, and Vicaquirau Inca.  Vicaquirau Inca and Roca's nephew Apu Mayta were great warriors, who helped subjugate Muyna, Pinahua and Caytomarca.  He died in 1388 at the age of 57 years.

Biography 
Roca's father was the Emperor Cápac Yupanqui, whose heir apparent (by his wife Cusi Hilpay) had been his son Quispe Yupanqui.

However, after Cápac Yupanquiʻs death, the hanan moiety rebelled against the hurin, killed Quispe Yupanqui, and gave the throne to Inca Roca, son of another of Cápac Yupanquiʻs wives, Cusi Chimbo. Inca Roca moved his palace into the hurin section of Cuzco.

In legend, he is said to have conquered the Chancas (among other peoples), as well as established the yachaywasi, schools for teaching nobles. More soberly, he seems to have improved the irrigation works of Cuzco and neighboring areas, but the Chancas continued to trouble his successors.

References

Further reading

 Cobo, Bernabe (1979) History of the Inca Empire: An Account of the Indians' Customs and Their Origin, Together with a Treatise on Inca Legends, History, and Social Institutions (translated and edited by Roland Hamilton from the holograph manuscript in the Biblioteca Capitular y Colombina de Sevilla) University of Texas Press, Austin, Texas, 
 Zuidema, R. Tom "Inka Dynasty and Irrigation: Another Look at Andean Concepts of History" pp. 177–200 In Murra, John V.; Wachtel, Nathan and Revel, Jacques (editors) (1986) Anthropological History of Andean Politics Cambridge University Press, Cambridge, England, 

Inca emperors
14th-century monarchs in South America